INS Nashak (K87) (Destroyer) was a  of the Indian Navy.

References

Vidyut-class missile boats
Fast attack craft of the Indian Navy